This article is a list of buildings and structures in Cape Verde ordered by city or island:

Boa Vista
Nossa Senhora da Conceição church in Povoação Velha
Aristides Pereira International Airport near Rabil
Forte Duque de Bragança on Ilhéu de Sal Rei
Estádio Municipal Arsénio Ramos in Sal Rei

Brava
Esperadinha Airport (closed)
Estádio Aquiles de Oliveira in Nova Sintra
Ilhéu de Cima Lighthouse

Fogo

Estádio Municipal Francisco José Rodrigues in Mosteiros
Estádio Monte Pelado in Cova Figueira
Estádio 5 de Julho in São Filipe
Museu Municipal de São Filipe in São Filipe
São Filipe Airport near São Filipe

Maio
Estádio Municipal 20 de Janeiro - Cidade do Maio - multiuse stadium

Sal
Amílcar Cabral International Airport, Espargos
Estádio Marcelo Leitão, Espargos
Farol da Ponta do Sinó, Santa Maria
Farol de Ponta de Vera Cruz, Santa Maria
Farol de Pedra de Lume, Pedra de Lume
Farol da Ponta Norte

Santiago

Santo Antão

Estádio Municipal do Porto Novo, Porto Novo
Agostinho Neto Airport, Ponta do Sol
Estádio João Serra, Ribeira Grande
Farol da Ponta de Tumbo, Janela

São Nicolau
Estádio João de Deus Lopes da Silva - Ribeira Brava
Forte do Príncipe Real in Preguiça

Sao Vicente

See also
List of airports in Cape Verde
List of churches in Cape Verde
List of football stadiums in Cape Verde
List of lighthouses in Cape Verde
List of museums in Cape Verde
List of universities in Cape Verde

Related articles:
Architecture of Cape Verde